{{Drugbox
| Verifiedfields = 
| Watchedfields = 
| verifiedrevid = 
| IUPAC_name = 4-({2-[(1R,2R,3aS,3bS,10aR,10bS,11S,12aS)-1,11-Dihydroxy-2,5,10a,12a-tetramethyl-7-phenyl-1,2,3,3a,3b,7,10,10a,10b,11,12,12a-dodecahydrocyclopenta[5,6]naphtho[1,2-f]indazol-1-yl]-2-oxoethoxy}carbonyl)benzenesulfonic acid
| image = Cortisuzol.svg
| width = 

| tradename = Solu-Altim
| pregnancy_AU = 
| pregnancy_US = 
| pregnancy_category = 
| legal_AU = 
| legal_CA = 
| legal_UK = 
| legal_US = 
| legal_status = 
| routes_of_administration = 

| bioavailability = 
| protein_bound = 
| metabolism = 
| elimination_half-life = 
| excretion =

| CAS_number_Ref = 
| CAS_number = 50801-44-0
| CAS_supplemental = 
| class = Corticosteroid; Glucocorticoid
| ATC_prefix = 
| ATC_suffix = 
| ATC_supplemental = 
| PubChem = 3037936
| IUPHAR_ligand = 
| DrugBank_Ref = 
| DrugBank = 
| ChemSpiderID_Ref = 
| ChemSpiderID = 16736901
| UNII = 1PA76KJ99Y
| KEGG = 
| ChEBI = 
| ChEMBL = 2106054

| C=37 | H=40 | N=2 | O=8 | S=1
| SMILES = C[C@@H]1C[C@H]2[C@@H]3C=C(C4=CC5=C(C[C@@]4([C@H]3[C@H](C[C@@]2([C@]1(C(=O)COC(=O)C6=CC(=CC=C6)S(=O)(=O)O)O)C)O)C)C=NN5C7=CC=CC=C7)C
| StdInChI_Ref = 
| StdInChI = 1S/C37H40N2O8S/c1-21-13-27-29-14-22(2)37(43,32(41)20-47-34(42)23-9-8-12-26(15-23)48(44,45)46)36(29,4)18-31(40)33(27)35(3)17-24-19-38-39(30(24)16-28(21)35)25-10-6-5-7-11-25/h5-13,15-16,19,22,27,29,31,33,40,43H,14,17-18,20H2,1-4H3,(H,44,45,46)/t22-,27+,29+,31+,33-,35+,36+,37+/m1/s1
| StdInChIKey_Ref = 
| StdInChIKey = ZKIDWWQMNXGYHV-BYJSBFAFSA-N
| synonyms = RU-16999; 11β,17α,21-Trihydroxy-6,16α-dimethyl-2'-phenyl-2H-pregna-2,4,6-trieno[3,2-c]pyrazol-20-one 21-(m''-sulfobenzoate)
}}Cortisuzol (brand name Solu-Altim; developmental code name RU-16999''') is a synthetic glucocorticoid corticosteroid.

References

Benzoate esters
Ketones
Glucocorticoids
Sulfonic acids
Phenyl compounds
Pregnanes
Pyrazoles
Triols